Claire Roman (born Claire-Henrietta Emilia Chambaud, 25 March 1906 – 8 August 1941) was a French aviator. In the 1930s she participated in speed races and broke world records for altitude and speed, and completed a long-distance flight to India. During World War II Roman served in the French Air Force and was captured by the Germans. She escaped and continued to fly until her death in 1941 as a passenger on a civilian flight which crashed in bad weather.

Early years 
Roman was born in Mulhouse. She was sent to England at the age of 16 to learn the English language, and on her return to France studied philosophy at Sorbonne University. She also studied nursing, graduating in 1927.

Adult life 
In 1929 Roman married Serge Roman, a veteran of World War I. He committed suicide in March 1932, and Roman joined the International Red Cross Movement as a nurse. She was assigned to Meknes, Morocco, where she became fascinated with aviation, and in November 1932 she earned her pilot's licence. The following year she returned to Paris to live, and joined flying clubs and learnt to fly other aircraft such as the Caudron C272, the Morane-Saulnier and the Potez 43. In 1934 she went to England and learnt night flying. The following year she competed in the inaugural Hélène Boucher Cup, finishing second behind Maryse Hilsz. In 1936 she was also second, behind Hilsz, in that year's cup race.

In December 1937, Roman broke the international women's altitude record by flying to an altitude of 6,782 metres. The following day she also broke the world women's speed record by reaching a speed of 245 km/hr. The same year, she completed a long-distance flight from Paris to Pondicherry, India with her friend Alix Lucas-Naudin.

At the outbreak of World War II, Roman volunteered to transport aircraft to training bases. In June 1940 Guy La Chambre signed a government decree permitting women pilots to join the French Air Force as an auxiliary pilot, and Roman was one of the first to sign up. She was responsible for evacuating aircraft from behind German lines, and while performing this work was captured by the Germans in Brittany. She escaped to Bordeaux and resumed her duties there.

In August 1941 Roman's mother fell ill in Pau, in the Pyrénées-Atlantiques region, and Roman travelled as a passenger in a civilian aircraft to visit her. The plane crashed in the mountains of the Lapradelle-Puilaurens area in bad weather, and Roman was killed, aged 35.

In 2017, an exhibition on Roman's life and achievements was opened at an aeronautical museum in Blagnac, including items found in June 2016 at the site of the crash which killed Roman in 1941.

References

1906 births
1941 deaths
Military personnel from Mulhouse
French women aviators
Aviators killed in aviation accidents or incidents in France
French prisoners of war in World War II
French Air Force personnel of World War II
French aviation record holders
French women aviation record holders
20th-century French women
World War II prisoners of war held by Germany
French women in World War II